Maingri is a Union Council in Shakargarh Tehsil of Narowal District in the  Punjab province of Pakistan, it is located at an elevation of 243 metres. Maingri and the adjoining town of Nurkot together form the largest and the most important town of the Constituency PP-134 (Narowal-III) of Provincial Assembly of Punjab.

References

External links
 News of Narowal, Sahkargarh, Zafarwal and other towns, villages. www.barapind.co.cc
Bara Pind's official web site : www.barapind.com

Narowal District